A by-election was held in the New South Wales state electoral district of Vaucluse on 9 April 1994. The by-election was triggered by the resignation of Michael Yabsley.

Dates

Results

Michael Yabsley resigned.

See also
Electoral results for the district of Vaucluse
List of New South Wales state by-elections

References

1994 elections in Australia
New South Wales state by-elections
1990s in New South Wales
April 1994 events in Australia